Strychnos potatorum also known as clearing-nut tree (Telugu: చిల్లగింజ, Kannada: kataka/ಕತಕ, Tamil: தேத்தான் கொட்டை(Thethankottai), Bengali: কতকা Hindi: Nirmali Burmese: ခပေါင်းရေကြည်, Sinhala ඉඟිනි) is a deciduous tree which has height up to . The seeds of the tree are commonly used in traditional medicine as well as for purifying water in India and Myanmar.

References

External links
Flora Zambesiaca

potatorum